The 1980–81 Rutgers Scarlet Knights men's basketball team represented Rutgers University in 1980–81 NCAA Division I men's basketball season.

Schedule

|-
!colspan=12 style=|Eastern 8 tournament

References 

Rutgers Scarlet Knights men's basketball seasons
1980 in sports in New Jersey
1981 in sports in New Jersey